Seventh-day Adventist Church, Karnal is the one of the two Protestant Church in Nilokheri, it is the only Adventist Church in the area.

History
With the establishment of Nilokheri township the Adventist Church was established in 1950 by the Protestant Indian Christians.

Parish members
There are 50 families and a total of 250 people in the parish. Christian devotees are the people from various regions of India such as Jharkhand, Punjab, South India etc. apart from local Christians who settled here due to the reason of employment.

Priest in the service of Church
Pastor Sunny i.e. Manzoor Masshi serves the church Since it was built.

See also
Nilokheri

References

Churches in Haryana
Seventh-day Adventist churches
Churches completed in 2001